Malonic anhydride or oxetane-2,4-dione is an organic compound with chemical formula C3H2O3 or CH2(CO)2O. It can be viewed as the anhydride of malonic acid, or a double ketone of oxetane.

Malonic anhydride was first synthesized in 1988 by ozonolysis of diketene. Some derivatives, such as 3,3-dimethyl-oxetane-2,4-dione, are known.

References

See also
 Carbon suboxide (C3O2), an anhydride of malonic anhydride.
 2-oxetanone, also called β-propiolactone
 3-oxetanone

Carboxylic anhydrides
Oxetanes
Substances discovered in the 1980s